Kızılliman (literally" Red harbor") is a Mediterranean headland in Turkey known for the ruins of ancient stone quarry Melenie.

Administratively, it is a part of Bozyazı ilçe (district) of Mersin Province.

The ancient quarry Melenie is on the headland. The stone material of the quarry is a type of stone more malleable than the other type of stones around like slate or shale. In the ruins there are partially shaped stone blocks which give the impression that the site was aboandoned in a hurry.

References

Geography of Mersin Province
Bozyazı District
Headlands of Turkey